The Iran International Exhibitions Company (IIEC) oversees and operates all international and specialized exhibitions held in Iran. Site features exhibitions calendar and provides trade laws and regulations. IIEC is affiliated with the Iranian Ministry of Commerce. 
IIEC is located at the Tehran permanent fairground.

History

See also
IBTour.ir
Tehran International Book Fair
Economy of Iran
Tourism in Iran
List of convention and exhibition centers in Iran

References

 http://www.ibtour.ir/iran-international-exhibition/

External links

 Iran Trade show
 

Calendars
 IIEC Calendar of events (2014)
 IIEC Calendar of events (2015 - 2016)

Event management companies of Iran